13 is the first EP by American hip hop duo Ces Cru. The EP was released on August 28, 2012, by Strange Music. The EP debuted at number 156 on the Billboard 200 chart.

Commercial performance
The album debuted at number 156 on the Billboard 200 chart, with first-week sales of 2,900 copies in the United States.

Track listing

Charts

References

2012 EPs
Strange Music EPs